Anion exchange membrane (AEM) electrolysis is the electrolysis of water that utilises a semipermeable membrane that conducts hydroxide ions (OH−) called an anion exchange membrane. Like a proton-exchange membrane (PEM), the membrane separates the products, provides electrical insulation between electrodes, and conducts ions. Unlike PEM, AEM conducts hydroxide ions. The major advantage of AEM water electrolysis is that a high-cost noble metal catalyst is not required, low-cost transition metal catalyst can be used instead. AEM electrolysis is similar to alkaline water electrolysis, which uses a non-ion-selective separator instead of an anion-exchange membrane.



Advantages and Challenges

Advantages
Of all water electrolysis methods, AEM electrolysis can combine the advantages of alkaline water electrolysis (AWE) and PEM electrolysis.
Polymer electrolyte membrane electrolysis uses expensive platinum-group metals (PGMs) such as Pt, Ir, and Ru as a catalyst. Like alkaline water electrolysis, electrodes in AEM electrolysis operate in an alkaline environment, which allows non-noble, low-cost catalysts based on Ni, Fe, Co, Mn, Cu, etc to be used.

AEM electrolyser can run on pure water or slightly alkaline solutions (0.1-1M KOH/NaOH) unlike highly concentrated alkaline solutions (5M KOH/NaOH) in AWE. This reduces the risk of leakage. Using an alkaline solution, usually KOH/NaOH increases membrane conductivity and adds a hydroxide ion conductive pathway, which increases the utilisation of catalyst. The current density of an AEM electrolyser without a PGM catalyst operating at 1 A/cm2 was reported to require 1.8 volts and 1.57 volts in pure water-fed and 1 M KOH-fed, respectively. Electrolyte can be fed on both anode and cathode side or anode side only.

In the zero-gap design of AWE, the electrodes are separated only by a diaphragm which separates the gases. The diaphragm only allows water and hydroxide ions to pass through, but does not completely eliminate gas cross-over. Oxygen gas can enter the hydrogen half-cell and react on the cathode side to form water, which reduces the efficiency of the cell. Gas cross-over from the H2 to the O2 evolution side can pose a safety hazard because it can create an explosive gas mixture with >4%mol H2.  The AEM electrolyser was reported to maintain H2 crossover to less than 0.4% for the 5000 hr of operation.

AEM based on an aromatic polymer backbone is promising due to its significant cost reduction. Compare to Nafion membrane use in PEM, the production of Nafion required highly toxic chemicals, which increased the cost (>1000$/m2) and fluorocarbon gas is produced at the production stage of
tetrafluoroethylene, which poses a strong environmental impact. Fluorinated raw materials are inessential for AEM, allowing for a wider selection of low-cost polymer chemistry.

Challenges

AEM electrolysis is still in the early research and development stage, while alkaline water electrolysis is in the mature stage and PEM electrolysis is in the commercial stage. There is less academic literature on pure-water fed AEM electrolysers compared to the usage of KOH solution.
The major technical challenge facing a consumer level AEM electrolyser is the low durability of the membrane, which refers to the short device lifetime or longevity. The lifetimes of PEM electrolyser stacks range from 20,000 hr to 80,000 hr. Literature surveys have found that AEM electrolyser durability is demonstrated to be >2000 hr, >12,000 hr, and >700 hr for pure water-fed (Pt group catalyst on anode and cathode), concentrated KOH-fed, and 1wt% K2CO3-fed respectively.

To overcome the obstacles for a large scale usage of AEM, increasing ionic conductivity and durability is essential. Many AEM breakdown at temperatures higher than 60°C, AEM that can tolerate the presence of O2, high pH, and temperatures exceeding 60°C are needed.

Science

Reactions
Oxygen evolution reactions (OER) need four electrons to produce one molecule of O2, consume multiple OH- anions, and form multiple adsorbed intermediates on the surface of the catalyst. These multiple steps of reaction create a high energy barrier and thus a high overpotential, which causes the OER to be sluggish. The performance of the AEM electrolyser largely depends on OER. The overpotential of OER can be reduced with an efficient catalyst that breaks the reaction's intermediate bond.
Hydrogen evolution reaction (HER) kinetics in alkaline solutions are slower than in acidic solutions because of additional proton dissociation and the formation of hydrogen intermediate (H*) that is not present in acidic conditions.

Anode reaction

Where the * indicate species adsorbed to the surface of the catalyst.

Cathode reaction
The reaction starts with water adsorption and dissociation in Volmer step and either hydrogen desorption in the Tafel step or Heyrovsky step.

Anion exchange membrane

Hydroxide ion intrinsically has lower mobility than H+, increasing ion exchange capacity can compensate for this lower mobility but also increase swelling and reduce membrane mechanical stability. Cross-linking membranes can compensate for membrane mechanical instability. The quaternary ammonium (QA) headgroup is commonly employed to attach polymer matrices in AEM. The head group allows anions but not cations to be transported. QA AEMs have low chemical stability because they are susceptible to OH- attack. Promising head group candidates include imidazolium-based head group and nitrogen-free head groups such as phosphonium, sulphonium, and ligand-metal complex. Most QAs and imidazolium groups degrade in alkaline environments by Hofmann degradation, SN2, or ring-opening reaction, especially at high temperatures and pH.

Polymeric AEM backbones are cationic-free base polymers. Poly(arylene ether)-based backbones, polyolefin-based backbones, polyphenylene-based backbones, and backbones containing cationic moieties are some examples. 

Some of the best-performing AEMs are HTMA-DAPP, QPC-TMA, m-PBI, and PFTP.

Membrane electrode assembly
A membrane electrode assembly (MEA) is made of an anode and cathode catalyst layer with a membrane layer in between. The catalyst layer can be deposited on the membrane or the substrate. Catalyst-coated substrate (CCS) and catalyst-coated membrane (CCM) are two approaches to preparing MEA. A substrate must conduct electricity, support the catalyst mechanically, and remove gaseous products. 

Nickel is typically used as a substrate for AEM, while titanium is for PEM; both nickel and titanium can be used on AEM. Carbon materials are not suitable for the anode side because of their degradation by HO- ions, which are nucleophiles. On the cathode, nickel, titanium, and carbon can be readily used. The catalyst layer is typically made by mixing catalyst powder and ionomer to produce an ink or slurry that is applied by spraying or painting. 
 Other methods include electrodeposition, magnetron sputtering, chemical electroless plating, and screen printing onto the substrate. 

Ionomers act as a binder for the catalyst, substrate support, and membrane, which also provide OH- conducting ions and increase electrocatalytic activities.

Ionomer

See also

Electrochemistry
Electrochemical engineering
Electrolysis
Hydrogen production
Photocatalytic water splitting
Timeline of hydrogen technologies
Electrolysis of water
PEM fuel cell
proton-exchange membrane
Hydrogen economy
High-pressure electrolysis

References

Electrolysis
Hydrogen economy
Hydrogen production
Electrolytic cells